Berghem or Berchem may refer to:

 Berchem in Belgium
 Berchem, Luxembourg
 Berghem in North Brabant, the Netherlands
 Berghem, Limburg, a hamlet in the Netherlands
 Bergamo an Italian city in Lombardy named Bèrghem in Lombard
 Nicolaes Pieterszoon Berchem, a painter
 Swedish cities Gothenburg, Järfälla and Umeå have districts named Berghem (lit. Mountain-home)